Cham Shahi (also Romanized as Cham Shāhī) is a village in Qalayi Rural District, Firuzabad District, Selseleh County, Lorestan Province, Iran. At the 2006 census, its population was 97, in 17 families.

References 

Towns and villages in Selseleh County